A telegraph hill is a hill or other natural elevation that is chosen as part of an optical telegraph system. 

Telegraph Hill may also refer to:

England
 A high point in the Haldon Hills, Devon
 Telegraph Hill, Dorset, a hill in the Dorset Downs
 A hill in the Chalk Downs of Hamphire
 Telegraph Hill, Hertfordshire, a nature reserve
 Telegraph Hill (ward), an electoral ward in Lewisham, London
 Telegraph Hill, Barnet, in Childs Hill, a ward of the London Borough of Barnet
 Telegraph Hill, Lewisham, a conservation area in London
 Telegraph Hill in Claygate, a suburban village in Surrey
 Telegraph Hill, Sussex, a hill of West Sussex

United States
 Telegraph Hill, San Francisco, a toponym and neighborhood in San Francisco, California
 Telegraph Hill (Dukes County, Massachusetts), an elevation in Massachusetts
 Telegraph Hill (Hull, Massachusetts), a historic site in Plymouth County
 Telegraph Hill (Provincetown, Massachusetts), an elevation in Barnstable County
 Telegraph Hill (Sandwich, Massachusetts), an elevation in Barnstable County 
 Telegraph Hill (Woods Hole, Massachusetts), an elevation in Barnstable County 
 Telegraph Hill in Dorchester Heights, South Boston, Massachusetts